1st Mission Support Command is a United States Army Reserve command providing support to military units based in Puerto Rico and the US Virgin Islands. Headquartered at Fort Buchanan within the metropolitan area of the Puerto Rico's capital San Juan the command consists of 35 units and fields 3,800 soldiers.

History 

Reserve units have served in Puerto Rico since 1922 when the 373rd Infantry was moved to the Organized Reserve and headquartered in San Juan, Puerto Rico.

In 1973, the Support Group was placed directly under First United States Army. By 1974, the 166th Support Group was given full mission control of all United States Army Reserve units in Puerto Rico and the United States Virgin Islands and assumed the mission and functions of a major U.S. Army Reserve Command, under First U.S. Army.

The Garita patch is worn by members assigned to this unit.

Subordinate units 

As of 2017 the following units are subordinated to the 1st Mission Support Command:
 1st Mission Support Command, at Fort Buchanan, Puerto Rico
 166th Regional Support Group, at Fort Buchanan, Puerto Rico
 346th Transportation Battalion, at Roosevelt Roads Naval Station, Puerto Rico
 393rd Combat Sustainment Support Battalion, at Fort Buchanan, Puerto Rico
 210th Regional Support Group, in Aguadilla, Puerto Rico
 35th Signal Battalion, at Fort Allen
 77th Combat Sustainment Support Battalion, in Aguadilla, Puerto Rico
 448th Engineer Battalion, at Fort Buchanan, Puerto Rico
 Caribean Readiness Group, at Fort Buchanan
 1st Battalion, 333rd Regiment (Multifunctional Training Battalion)
 1st Battalion, 389th Regiment
 2nd Battalion, 348 Regiment
 49th Multifunctional Medical Battalion
 402nd Civil Affairs Battalion

References 

Support Commands of the United States Army
Military units and formations of the United States Army Reserve
Military units and formations in Puerto Rico